Robert Charles Douglas Flello (born 14 January 1966) is a British Liberal Democrat politician who was Labour  Member of Parliament (MP) for Stoke-on-Trent South from 2005 to 2017.  He lost his seat at the 2017 general election to Conservative Party candidate Jack Brereton.

Early life
Flello was born in Bournville, Birmingham. He attended Bournville Junior and Infant schools before going to King's Norton Boys' School. At age 18 he went to University of Wales, Bangor to read Chemistry. He graduated in 1987 with a B.Sc (Hons).

Career
After graduating, Flello worked for a short time at Cadbury in Bournville before joining the Inland Revenue. In 1989 he left to join Price Waterhouse accountants as a personal tax advisor. In 1995 he moved to Arthur Andersen. In 1999, he co-founded Platts Flello Limited, tax and financial advisors. In late 2003 he left to work as the CEO of Malachi Community Trust until December 2004.

Political career
Flello was elected as a councillor to the Longbridge ward of Birmingham City Council in 2002, stepping down in 2004. He is a former chairman of the Birmingham Northfield Constituency Labour Party. He served as a governor at the Newman College in Bartley Green, and was Chair of Governors for both Colmers Farm infants and junior schools. He was also a governor at The Meadows primary school. He served as a regional organiser for the Labour Party in 2004 until his election to Westminster.

Parliament
Flello was elected to the House of Commons at the 2005 general election for Stoke-on-Trent South following the retirement of George Stevenson. Flello held the seat with a majority of 8,681 and made his maiden speech on 19 May 2005.

In parliament he was a member of the Science and Technology Select Committee. While Labour were in government he served as Parliamentary Private Secretary first to the Lord Chancellor, Charles Falconer, Baron Falconer of Thoroton, then to the Secretary of State for Communities and Local Government, Hazel Blears, and finally after 2009 to the Secretary of State for Defence, Bob Ainsworth.

In June 2016, Labour Party activists in Stoke-on-Trent South proposed a motion of no confidence in Flello after he called on Labour leader Jeremy Corbyn to "do the decent thing and resign". He had supported Owen Smith in the failed attempt to replace Jeremy Corbyn in the 2016 Labour leadership election.

In 2019 he defected to the Lib Dems and was selected as their parliamentary candidate for his old seat. 36 hours after his selection, however, the Lib Dems deselected Flello, citing "how greatly his values diverge from ours". It is believed that they objected to his socially conservative views on abortion and same-sex marriage.

Social views
Flello is a convert to Catholicism and stated in 2014 "I could no more leave my faith at the door of the House of Commons than I could my name or my gender or my arms and legs". He was a member of the anti-abortion All-Party Parliamentary Pro-Life Group. Flello also opposes same-sex marriage and was one of the few Labour MPs to vote against the Marriage (Same Sex Couples) Act 2013, citing his religious views.

In 2007, Flello was accused of filibustering a fellow Labour backbencher's private members bill. The bill, introduced by neighbouring Staffordshire MP Paul Farrelly, aimed to give temporary and agency workers similar employment rights to permanent staff. It was backed by the Unite trade union. The incident provoked an angry response in the Daily Mirror.

In 2017, Flello blamed "shocking congestion" in London on the loss of tarmac from building cycle lanes, which received a critical response from bike charity the London Cycling Campaign and cycling website road.cc, both pointing out that tarmac had been repurposed to another form of transport and that the increased number of journeys overall in Central London were what was causing congestion, not the segregated cycle tracks that are on less than 1% of London roads.

References

External links

1966 births
Living people
Alumni of Bangor University
British Roman Catholics
Councillors in Birmingham, West Midlands
Labour Party (UK) MPs for English constituencies
People from Birmingham, West Midlands
British anti-abortion activists
Converts to Roman Catholicism
UK MPs 2005–2010
UK MPs 2010–2015
UK MPs 2015–2017